Carl Wilhelm Hugo Rüster (born 15 January 1872 in Berlin, - 3 April 1962) was a German rower who competed in the 1900 Summer Olympics.

He was part of the German crew who won the bronze medal in the coxed fours final A.

References

External links

 

1872 births
Year of death missing
Olympic rowers of Germany
Rowers at the 1900 Summer Olympics
Olympic bronze medalists for Germany
Olympic medalists in rowing
German male rowers
Medalists at the 1900 Summer Olympics
Rowers from Berlin